Working for Peanuts is a 1953 animated short produced by Walt Disney, featuring Donald Duck and Chip 'n' Dale. It is notable for being one of their first shorts filmed in 3D (the first being Adventures in Music: Melody, which was released several months before). The tagline of the film is "Walt Disney's Donald Duck & Chip 'N Dale in their first laugh riot in 3-Dimension."

In 2006, it was remastered for digital 3D purposes and rereleased in 2007 along with the Disney Digital 3-D version of the Walt Disney Animation Studios film Meet the Robinsons.

Working for Peanuts was also showcased a number of times at the Disney theme parks and was used as a teaser 3D cartoon at Walt Disney World's Magic Kingdom, which showcased a 3D movie, Magic Journeys,  that was sponsored by Kodak.

The title "Working for Peanuts", which is a common expression to indicate earning low wages, is used to allude to the development in the story related to the elephant's peanuts.

Plot
While collecting acorns, Chip 'n' Dale discover a peanut that had been thrown from the nearby zoo. At the zoo, guests give out peanuts to the animals, and Donald Duck takes care of Dolores the Elephant. Chip 'n' Dale try to take the Elephant's peanuts, but Dolores won't let them.

Trying to escape from Donald, Dale trips in a bucket of white paint, covering himself in it. This gives Chip an idea. Smiling, he says, "I've got an idea! Listen to this!" before grabbing Dale's ear and beginning to whisper in it. He whispers his plan in Dale's ear. While he is whispering, Dale listens closely and begins to smile, liking Chip's plan. He continues to smile as Chip continues to whisper. When he has finished whispering, he grabs the paintbrush and begins to cover Dale in paint. Together, the two cover themselves in the white paint and successfully convince Donald that they belong in an albino chipmunk exhibit at the zoo, where they are fed peanuts.

In this film, for the first time Chip has been slapped with a fish by Dale, usually the other way round.

Voice cast
 Donald Duck: Clarence Nash 
 Chip: Jimmy MacDonald
 Dale: Dessie Flynn

Releases
1953 – theatrical release
1956 – As part of "3D Jamboree" (Disneyland)
1960 – Walt Disney Presents, episode #6.23: "This Is Your Life, Donald Duck" (TV)
c. 1983 – Good Morning, Mickey!, episode #8 (TV)
1987 – Preshow for "Magic Journeys" at Walt Disney World's Magic Kingdom (theme park)
c. 1992 – Donald's Quack Attack, episode #44 (TV)
1998 – The Ink and Paint Club, episode #1.42: "Goin' to the Zoo" (TV)
2006 – As part of the World 3D Film Expo II
2007 – Reissued with 3D version of Meet the Robinsons (theatrical)

Home media
The short was released on November 11, 2008 on Walt Disney Treasures: The Chronological Donald, Volume Four: 1951-1961.

Additional releases include:

1981 – Mickey Mouse and Donald Duck Cartoon Collections Volume Three (VHS)
1987 – Cartoon Classics: Starring Chip 'n Dale (VHS)
2005 – Classic Cartoon Favorites: Starring Chip 'n Dale (DVD)

Also, in 2010, Walt Disney Home Entertainment partnered with Mitsubishi Electric to bring the Disney Digital 3D Showcase Disc to homes across the country. The disc is a full HD 1080P Blu-ray 3D disc and requires a 3D-capable HDTV, 3D-capable Blu-ray player and compatible glasses to enjoy. The disc was not released for general retail and was only available as a part of Mitsubishi's 3D Starter Kit.

References

External links

1953 animated films
1953 short films
1950s Disney animated short films
American comedy short films
Donald Duck short films
Films directed by Jack Hannah
Films produced by Walt Disney
1953 3D films
Films scored by Oliver Wallace
3D animated short films
1950s English-language films
American animated short films
Films about ducks
Films about rodents
Animated films about elephants
1950s American films
Animated films about birds
Films set in zoos
Chip 'n' Dale films